The Riga–Schaulen offensive was a major Imperial German Army's offensive, launched by the Army of the Niemen of Paul von Hindenburg's group of armies to divert Russian forces from the direction of the main blow of the summer offensive on Narew. However, it gradually changed into an offensive of two left-wing German armies to capture the Kovno fortress and reach the Western Dvina. 
In the course of a successful offensive, the German army defeated the superior forces of the Russian army and reached the approaches to the important city of Riga.

Background 

Together with the offensive of the army group of M. von Gallwitz on the Narew River and the army group of A. von Mackensen between the Vistula and the Bug, the Army of the Niemen of the army group of P. von Hindenburg carried out an operation against the right flank of the Russian Northwestern Front, in fact continuing the active operations begun on the Riga direction at the end of April 1915. This operation was undertaken at the insistence of the Supreme Commander of All German Forces in the East - Paul von Hindenburg and his Chief of the Staff E. Ludendorff, contrary to the negative opinion of Chief of the German Great General Staff, E. von Falkenhayn. The result of intense disputes was a compromise decision on the distracting nature of the new offensive on the Neman and in Courland, which was more in line with both the more complex natural environment (the area abounded in rivers, forests and swamps), and the importance attached by the Russian command to Riga and the Western Dvina River. For the Supreme Commander of All German Forces in the East, the main goal of the actions was the envelopment and final capture of the Kovno fortress, which supported the Russian battle formations on the Neman - close to the German border.

Comparison of strength

For the offensive on Riga, the  Army of the Niemen of Infantry General Otto von Below (Chief of Staff, Major General Alfred von Böckmann) had 158,905 soldiers and officers and 600 guns in service, including only 50 heavy ones, and was operationally subdivided into the strong Northern Group of Lieutenant General Otto von Lauenstein and the Southern Group of Karl Ernst Manfred Freiherr von Richthofen. The first received the task of advancing to the highway from Schaulen  to Mitava and through Goldingen to Tukun: the second went on the offensive a few days later, linking the Russian troops along the front.

On the Russian side, from the mouth of the Dubyssa River to the Baltic coast, the 5th Army of Cavalry General Pavel Plehve (chief of staff, Lieutenant General Yevgeny Miller) occupied fortified positions - 217,041 men. Russian troops outnumbered the Germans in manpower and were inferior in artillery (superior in heavy) and, possibly, in machine guns. Experiencing interruptions in the supply of ammunition, like the rest of the Russian armies, the 5th Army was able to dispose of reserves of fortresses and had more opportunities to hold the front.

German offensive on Riga

Russian counteroffensive near Riga
On August 2, the commander of the German 10th Army sent his chief of staff  E. Hell to Lötzen to convince the Supreme Commander of All German Forces in the East of the need to reinforce the army with at least one division to take Kovno. P. von Hindenburg promised E. Hell that the 6th Landwehr Brigade would be transferred from the 8th Army, the Landsturm Regiment and several heavy and super-heavy batteries from the 9th Army, and the Beckman division would be returned from the Army of the Niemen. The next day, Hindenburg managed to convince E. von Falkenhayn of the importance and possibility of a quick capture of Kovno; the Supreme High Command allocated the required number of shells for the operation.

On August 2–3, the Army of the Niemen pursued the retreating corps of the Russian 5th Army, capturing 3,250 prisoners and 2 machine guns. After receiving the order to turn the army to Vilno, O. von Below ordered to stop the pursuit, go on the defensive in the Riga direction, leaving only the 29th Landwehr and the 3rd and 18th cavalry brigades here, and send the infantry divisions to the south. To counter the German offensive on Riga, on August 3, P. Plehve entrusted the defense of the Riga fortified area to Lieutenant General N. Lisovsky, subordinating the 7th Siberian Army Corps to him, and ordered Lieutenant General G. Troubetzkoy to strike at the flank and rear of the Mitava's group.

Due to the retreat of the 19th Army Corps on the night of August 4, P. Plehve withdrew other corps of the 5th Army. Having received information about the transfer of part of the German troops from Riga, P. Plehve ordered his troops on August 5 to launch a counteroffensive. In stubborn fighting during the day, the Russians made little progress. The headquarters of the Army of the Niemen regarded the increase in the activity of the Russian side as an attempt to cover the flanks of the army. On August 7, the troops of the Riga fortified area entrenched themselves on the right bank of the Eckau River. In two days, 40 prisoners were taken.

The offensive of the Army of the Niemen O. von Below intended to strike at Wilkomir, concentrating three infantry divisions near Panevėžys, but it was necessary to replenish troops and ammunition. At the same time, the chief of staff of the 5th Army, E. Miller, informed the chief of staff of the armies of the North-Western Front, A. Gulevich, that with the army sector stretched over 250 versts, “there are absolutely no means to directly cover the paths to Vilna and Sventiany” . Therefore, he considered the creation of intermediate strongholds unsuitable for the situation and urged that all forces and means be urgently sent to build fortifications in front of Dvinsk.

After midnight on August 8, P. Plehve, dissatisfied with the results of the battles, ordered G. Troubetzkoy to personally lead the attack. By the night of August 9, the offensive was a complete success. During the day, more than 50 prisoners and 3 machine guns were captured. On August 9, the 5th Army continued its onslaught on the center of the Germans, repelling attempts to advance in the area of the Riga fortified area. In the sectors of the 19th and 3rd army corps, the Russian offensive developed successfully. By the morning of August 11, the Army of the Niemen still maintained positions on the Aa and Eckau rivers. Attempts by the Germans to go on the offensive on the front of the Riga fortified area were repulsed by them with the help of gunboats.

On the afternoon of August 12, in the Riga region, the 13th Siberian Rifle Division launched an offensive towards the Aa River and knocked out the Germans from the right bank. P. Plehve, around midnight on August 13, was ordered to G. Troubetzkoy and M. Grabbe with a concentrated blow to break through the positions of the Germans, and the 3rd and 19th Army Corps to strengthen their positions and conduct active reconnaissance, and in the event of an Germans retreat, vigorously pursue him.

On August 13, the Russian 5th Army again attacked the German positions and was met with stubborn resistance and counterattacks. If the 37th Army Corps and the 4th Cavalry Division moved forward and occupied Memelhof, then the 1st and 2nd cavalry divisions were pushed back beyond the Rovėja river, and the detachment of M. Grabbe was not successful. By order of P. Plehve, from 17 o'clock the 19th and 3rd army corps went on the offensive. Before nightfall, they managed to get within 300-600 paces of the German positions. The detachment of N. Kaznakov, having suffered significant losses from cannon and machine-gun fire from behind the Sventa River, retreated. On the night of August 14, P. Plehve replaced the temporary commander of the 37th Army Corps, Lieutenant General G. Levitsky, with Major General Januarius Tsikhovich, and the detachment of P. Troubetzkoy was disbanded, leaving only the 1st and 2nd cavalry divisions under his command.

On August 14, the 5th Army resumed the offensive. Until nightfall, the right wing of the army advanced successfully but slowly. The cavalry corps of Troubetzkoy and the detachment of Grabbe were pinned down by the attacks of the 5th German cavalry corps. The offensive of the 19th and 3rd army corps developed successfully until noon, but then the German 1st cavalry corps and the 78th reserve division launched a counterattack on the left flank of the 3rd army corps, after which, at about 17 hours, Plehve allowed the corps to withdraw, and ordered the cavalry on the flanks to hit the Germans in the rear. However, the blow did not work, the 1st reserve and 1st cavalry corps of the Germans continued to push the Russian units, which retreated by the morning of August 15 across the Vadva and Jara-Šetekšna rivers.

The stubborn battles with varying success that accompanied the offensive of the Russian 5th Army did not bring P. Plehve the expected results, but the Riga-Dvina direction was reliably covered, the offensive against Vilkomir, which was being prepared by the Germans, was thwarted, and the divisions ready to be sent against Kovno were detained to hold the positions of the Neman army. The German 10th Army also could not start an operation against Kovno in time.

Fall of the Kovno fortress

First offensive on Vilno
Since mid-August, the staff of Supreme Commander of All German Forces in the East, considered the idea of developing an offensive in the Neman region - by breaking through to Vilno and Minsk, which would intercept the withdrawal routes of the armies of the Russian North-Western Front from the Kingdom of Poland. For this, as the chief of staff of the Supreme Commander of All German Forces in the East, Ludendorff, believed, it was necessary to break through the Russian positions in front of the 10th and Neman armies, push the Russians back through Vilno to the Dvina River and send the cavalry to raid against Minsk and Polotsk to destroy and intercept the railways in the Russian rear. The right flank of the operation was to be provided by the 8th and 12th armies with an attack on the Pinsk Marshes. Falkenhayn was against such a plan, considering it impossible either to continue the offensive in winter or to invade deep into Russia: operations in the East were not supposed, as emphasized in the order of August 18, to go further than the line from Brest-Litovsk to Grodno, and "surplus" troops were to be transferred to other theaters. P. von Hindenburg disagreed with this vision of military planning: in the area of Augustow and Suwalki, the front passed too close to the German border. On August 19, he issued a new directive: the 12th and 8th armies to continue attacks. The 10th Army to develop an offensive with the left wing on Vilno, covering the Russian troops from the Neman to Druskininkai, with the right wing to advance from Augustow to Grodno. The 4th cavalry division and three landwehr divisions from the abolished X. von Beseler group entered the army. The Army of the Niemen was entrusted with covering the operation from the north with an offensive against Sventiany and Riga.

On August 20, the German 10th Army launched an offensive northeast of Kovno. Litzman's group (115th infantry, 3rd, 76th and 79th reserve divisions) crossed the Neris River and attacked the remnants of the Kovno garrison. The 6th cavalry corps occupied Yanov and created the threat of a breakthrough to Vilno through Wiłkomierz. Radkevich was also concerned about the situation at the junction with the 1st Army (after the departure of the 12th Army to Riga), where the evacuation of the Osowiec fortress was being completed: the abandonment of the fortress threatened the 20th Army Corps, which was in an advantageous position, and forced the evacuation of Grodno to also begin. The commander of the 10th Army considered the preservation of positions on the left bank of the Neman "highly desirable and possible."

In the conditions of the German advance to Vilno, the headquarters of the armies of the North-Western Front sent the 5th Army Corps to the 10th Army (the Guards Corps, landing in Vilno, was the reserve of the Russian Supreme Commander). On August 21, Radkevich ordered to prevent the Germans from entering the interfluve of the Neman and Neris rivers and to launch a counterattack with the right wing of the army. However, on August 21, the retreat of the right wing of the Russian 10th Army continued: the onslaught of the 6th Cavalry and 40th Reserve Corps of the Germans did not weaken. At 4 p.m. Radkevich ordered the 2nd and 26th Army Corps to cross the Neman River at night. By evening, it turned out that the right flank of the army was so upset that it could not withstand the attacks of the Germans and retreated. The 3rd Siberian and 2nd Army Corps went beyond the Neman. After the 1st Army abandoned the Osowiec fortress, it was necessary to begin the evacuation of Grodno. The commandant of the fortress, M. Kaigorodov, expected to remove artillery (128 guns), ammunition (300,000 poods of shells and 100,000 poods of gunpowder), engineering and quartermaster supplies (2.2 million poods) from the fortress by September 13 with the condition of supplying at least 289 platforms and 2,908 wagons. At the same time, for lack of time and transport, another 507 guns and 626,000 shells, 53 machine guns, 79 rocket launchers with 6,631 rockets, almost 6 million rifle cartridges and a 10-day supply of food for the 1st and 10th armies were left in Grodno.

In a difficult situation, the chief of staff of the 10th Army, Major General I. Popov, on the night of August 23, turned for help to the commander of the 5th Army, Plehve, to go on the offensive with the left flank to the west. The 20th Army Corps and the fortress of Grodno were transferred by order of the Commander-in-Chief of the armies of the North-Western Front Alekseyev to the 1st Army. However, the situation in the 5th Army was also difficult: from August 20, the Army of the Niemen, with the forces of the 5th Cavalry and 1st Reserve Corps, began to push the center of the 5th Army, knocking out the 37th Army Corps from Memelhof.

On the morning of August 23, the Germans attacked the detachments of Tsikhovich, Troubetzkoy and Mikhail Grabbe, pushing them back. As a result, the 19th Army Corps and the 3rd Army Corps took up new positions. On August 24, von Schmettov's cavalry, reinforced by the 41st Infantry Division with three heavy batteries and the  Otto von Homeyer brigade, struck again at the detachments of Trubetskoy, Tsikhovich and Grabbe; after 16 hours, all three detachments began to withdraw, leaving 700 prisoners in the hands of the enemy. Plehve was forced to send his last reserve, the 1st Nevsky Infantry Regiment, to the 37th Army Corps. At the same time, Tsikhovich ordered to shoot every hundredth of the 315th Glukhovsky Infantry Regiment, two battalions of which fled from their positions.

On August 23, the 10th Army was again attacked by the Germans on the Neman River. After a stubborn battle, the 2nd Army Corps and the 26th Army Corps withdrew. The guard divisions and the 5th Army Corps, which had begun to arrive in Vilno and Lentvaris, had to hold the front at Vilno. On August 24, Radkevich divided the army into two groups: the Vilno group of Lieutenant General Pyotr Baluyev (Guards, 5th and 34th army corps) and Neman group of the General of the Infantry B. Flug (3rd Siberian, 2nd and 26th army corps). Despite repeated orders to go on the offensive, the right wing of the 10th Army continued to retreat to Vilno and to the right bank of the Neman River.

On August 26, the Neman Army continued its offensive against Friedrichstadt by the forces of Lieutenant General Shmettov's group, which continuously attacked the positions of the 37th Army Corps. By the night of August 27, the positions of the Tsikhovich detachment on the Ponemunok River were broken through. Due to heavy losses and the complete breakdown of units, the 37th Army Corps was withdrawn. In order to restore the situation, Plehve ordered to strike at the flanks of the Germans advancing to the Western Dvina River and go to his rear. In the morning, the chief of staff of the 5th Army, E. Miller insistently asked to expedite the arrival in Dvinsk of the 28th Army Corps removed from the South-Western Front; its head trains began to arrive only late in the evening of 27 August.

The offensive of the Russian 19th and 3rd army corps against the 1st reserve corps of the Germans was not successful. The Ussuri Cavalry Brigade was withdrawn due to the retreat of the right wing of the 10th Army. By the night of August 28, the Germans captured the first position at Friedrichstadt.

On August 28, Plehve again persistently ordered G. Trubetskoy, leaving a small barrier, "with the rest of the forces to break through at all costs into the rear of the enemy advancing towards Friedrichstadt." But the defense of the German Army of the Niemen was precisely built on the maximum use of the terrain and villages as base lines and points. On August 28-29, von Schmettov's group was pushed back on the left flank to the Nemenek River, but broke through the second line of defense near Friedrichstadt. Artillery preparation destroyed the positions of the 2nd brigade of the 79th infantry division in 20 minutes. However, the Army of the Niemen failed to take Friedrichstadt on the move and capture the bridges on the Dvina River.

By August 26, the German 10th Army approached Vilno from the north and northwest. He managed to push back the mounted barriers of the Russian 10th Army. The Russian 5th Army Corps and the 3rd Siberian Army Corps were forced to retreat; the divisions of the Russian 2nd and 26th army corps were also withdrawn under the onslaught of the German 21st Army Corps. On August 27, Radkevich united the 124th Infantry, 2nd Finnish Rifle and Border Composite Divisions under the command of the commander of the 5th Caucasian Army Corps, Lieutenant General Nikolai Istomin, instructing them to stand to the death. The divisions of the 34th Army Corps, which had lost their combat effectiveness, were assigned to the reserve.

By evening, the front of the right wing of the 10th Army had partially stabilized a few kilometers north and west of Vilno. But by nightfall, the Germans began to push the regiments of the 2nd and 26th army corps.

The timely transfer and introduction of eight Russian divisions into battle north of Vilno frustrated Hindenburg's hopes for a quick (after the fall of Kovno) capture of this city, which was a major junction of railways and highways. Also, thanks to the active actions of the Russian 5th Army, the Germans failed to capture Jakobstadt and Friedrichstadt on the move. By this time, as the chief commander of the Dvina military district, engineer-general N. Tumanov, reported to the staff of the North-Western Front, work on the creation of the Dvina and Vilno's fortified positions was almost completely completed. On the first two, 30% of dugouts and shelters remained unfinished, on Dvinsk - another 10% of the barriers, but it was already possible to deploy troops. This facilitated the adoption of further decisions on the defense of the western provinces of the Russian Empire and on stopping the retreat.

Outcome 
German troops during the operation captured up to 51,000 prisoners, 1,326 guns (mainly in Kovno) and 40 machine guns. In the July battles, the Germans managed to disorient the command of the armies of the Russian North-Western Front (M. Alekseyev) and Headquarters, which caused the transfer of an entire army to the middle course of the Neman and to Riga. But in August, the Russian troops managed, actively defending themselves, to prevent the enemy from reaching the right bank of the Western Dvina and Vilna. The Russians captured 1,302 German prisoners and 9 machine guns. At the same time, major Russian failures in operations in this direction were the loss of control over the western part of the Gulf of Riga, the coast of Courland, the capture by the German troops of the Kovno fortress with its artillery and supplies.

See also
 Siege of Kovno

References

1915 in Europe
German Empire
Russian Empire
Battles of World War I involving Russia
Battles of World War I involving Germany